Jean Sassi (11 June 1917 – 9 January 2009) was a French Army colonel and intelligence service officer, former "Jedburgh" (BCRA) of France and Far East. Commando chief of the SDECE's 11th Shock Parachutist Regiment (11e régiment parachutiste de choc). Maquis chief in French Indochina through the GCMA (1953–1955).

During the Battle of Dien Bien Phu in April 1954 Jean Sassi led Mèo partisans (GCMA) in Operation Condor, also known as Operation D.

Honours and awards
 Commander of the Legion of Honour
 Croix de Guerre 1939-1945
 Croix de guerre des théâtres d'opérations extérieures
 Croix de la Valeur Militaire
 Croix du combattant volontaire 1939–1945
 Medal of the Order of the Million Elephants and the White Parasol

See also
Operation Jedburgh
Groupement de Commandos Mixtes Aéroportés

References

1917 births
2009 deaths
People from Tunis
French people of Corsican descent
French Army officers
French military personnel of World War II
French military personnel of the First Indochina War
French military personnel of the Algerian War
Commandeurs of the Légion d'honneur
Recipients of the Croix de Guerre 1939–1945 (France)
Recipients of the Cross for Military Valour
Recipients of the Croix de guerre des théâtres d'opérations extérieures